Bicycle Thieves is a 2013 Malayalam comedy thriller film written and directed  by Jis Joy. It stars Asif Ali in the lead role alongside Aparna Gopinath with Salim Kumar, Saiju Kurup, K. P. A. C. Lalitha, Aju Varghese, Sunil Sukhada and  Siddique in other pivotal roles. The film also features Sai Kumar and Devan. It received mixed to positive reviews from critics.

Summary
Chacko lost his parents early in his life. After years of struggle, he ends up with a gang of friends who steal bicycles for a living. Their fate changes when they try to aim for more. A heist goes wrong and the gang gets split. Chacko moves to another place where he continues with his tricks, on a bigger scale. During one of those endeavors he meets Meera, a bank employee, and they fall in love.

The first half of the film is used to introduce each character, without divulging many details; the viewer may guess that they all could have a possible role in the suspense later on.

Cast
 Asif Ali as Kunchacko/Chacko
 Aparna Gopinath as Meera Mathews
 Vijay Babu as Adv. Kashinathan
 Salim Kumar as Bose Prakash/Bossettan
 Siddique
Sunil Sukhada as Fa.Idayil Chodiyan
 Kishore Sathya as Sleeve Varghese
 Jaffar Idukki as Sajeer Bhayi
 Saiju Kurup as Rameshan
 K. P. A. C. Lalitha as Meera's Landlady 
 Bineesh Kodiyeri as Rahim
 Sai Kumar as Pattaru Swami
 Devan as Mathews
 Aju Varghese as Shajan (Cameo)
 Balu Varghese as Iqbal cameo
 Sekhar Menon as himself cameo
 Naveen Arakkal

Soundtrack 

All tracks composed by Deepak Dev and Jerry Amaldev, and written by Bichu Thirumala, Kaithapram, and Jis Joy.

References

2013 films
Indian comedy thriller films
2010s comedy thriller films
2010s Malayalam-language films
2013 comedy films
Films directed by Jis Joy